Işıkveren is a village in the Uludere District of Şırnak Province in Turkey. The village is populated by Kurds of the Goyan tribe and had a population of 320 in 2021.

References 

Villages in Uludere District
Kurdish settlements in Şırnak Province